Stretchin' Out is a 1983 studio album by a trio led by clarinetist Kenny Davern, along with Chuck Riggs and Dick Wellstood.

Track listing 
"The Man I Love" (7:33)       
"Summertime" (7:10)       
"Lover, Come Back to Me" (5:40)       
"Love Me or Leave Me" (6:07)       
"There Is No Greater Love" (8:06)       
"Chicago Rhythm" (6:55)

Personnel
Kenny Davern - clarinet
Dick Wellstood - piano
Chuck Riggs - drums

References

1983 albums
Kenny Davern albums
Dixieland revival albums
Dixieland albums
Swing albums